Eugagrella is a genus of harvestmen in the family Sclerosomatidae from South and Southeast Asia.

Species
 Eugagrella abdominalis Roewer, 1954
 Eugagrella aemula Roewer, 1954
 Eugagrella argentata Roewer, 1954
 Eugagrella barnesi Roewer, 1929
 Eugagrella bimaculata Suzuki, 1972
 Eugagrella carli Roewer, 1929
 Eugagrella celerrima (Loman, 1892)
 Eugagrella ceylonensis Roewer, 1954
 Eugagrella cuernosa Roewer, 1954
 Eugagrella fokiana Roewer, 1954
 Eugagrella jacobsoni Roewer, 1923
 Eugagrella laticlavia (Thorell, 1889)
 Eugagrella malabarica Roewer, 1954
 Eugagrella minima Roewer, 1954
 Eugagrella muara Roewer, 1923
 Eugagrella palliditarsus Roewer, 1923
 Eugagrella palnica Roewer, 1929
 Eugagrella rufescens (Thorell, 1889)
 Eugagrella rufispina Roewer, 1954
 Eugagrella simaluris Roewer, 1923
 Eugagrella stoliczkae (With, 1903)
 Eugagrella trimaculata Roewer, 1923
 Eugagrella variegata (Doleschall, 1859)
 Eugagrella yuennanana Roewer, 1954
 Eugagrella zilchi Roewer, 1954

References

Harvestmen
Harvestman genera